Windsor Alfredo del Llano Suárez (born 17 August 1949 in Cochabamba, Bolivia) is a retired footballer forward who earned one cap with the U.S. national team in 1973 and another thirty with Bolivia between 1975 and 1981.  He played professionally in both countries and currently coaches professional soccer in Bolivia.

Professional
In 1974, del Llano spent a single season with the Washington Diplomats of the North American Soccer League.  In 1975, he returned to Bolivia where he played for Club Jorge Wilstermann.  He returned to the U.S. in 1976 where he played for the Tacoma Tides of the American Soccer League.  In 1979, Del Llano was with the Bolivian club The Strongest.  In 1988, he played for the Miami Sharks in the American Soccer League.

National team

United States
Del Llano earned his single U.S. cap in a 1-0 loss to Poland on August 3, 1973.  Del Llano, and most of his team mates, were from the second division American Soccer League after the first division North American Soccer League refused to release players for the game.

Bolivia
In 1975, del Llano was then called to the Bolivia national team, notwithstanding his already appearing with the U.S.  He played thirty games, scoring one goal, from 1975 to 1981.

Coaching

United States

1984

Coached and played for local amateur team Sporting Peru in Miami, Florida.

1985

He coached and played for local amateur team Juventus in Miami, Florida.

1986

Del Llano coached and founded local amateur team Inter Miami, in Florida.

1987–1989

He started as a player and finished as a coach of the Miami Sharks in the American Soccer League.

Bolivia

Del Llano has also coached at the professional level in Bolivia.

1989

In August he coached Club Jorge Wilstermann in the First Division Championship League.

1998

Coach of the Bolivia national team U-17 and U-20. Won Panamericano Championship in Ancud, Chile, undefeated with U-17 team.

1999

Del Llano took the U-17 national team to the South American U-17 Championship, in Rivera, Uruguay. Finishing third in their group.

He coached Club Aurora, and won the regional championship, qualifying for Copa Simón Bolívar.

2000

Coached Club Atlético Pompeya, of the first division professional league of Bolivia (LFPB).

2001

Del Llano coached the Regional U-17 All-Star Team of Beni, Bolivia, winning the Bolivia National U-17 Championship, that took place in Cochabamba, Bolivia.

He also coached club Primero de Mayo in 2001, a club from Trinidad, Beni, who won their first regional championship, and reached the final stage of Copa Simón Bolívar for a chance to promote to first division.

2002

Named coach of Club Deportivo San José of the first division professional league in Bolivia (LFPB).

2003

Coached Liga Mercosur All-Star Team U-20 Championship in Piracicaba, São Paulo, Brazil.

2005

Del Llano was Club Aurora's Technical Manager of the First Division Team and also General Director of the Youth Division.

2006

In 2006, Del Llano was the director and coach of La Paz F.C.

2008

He was coach of Enrique Happ winning the Regional Championship and qualifying for Copa Simón Bolívar

2009

Del Llano coached Club Oruro Royal in Copa Simón Bolívar Championship.

2010

Coached Club Deportivo Bata which won the Regional Championship after 31 years, and qualified for Copa Simón Bolívar.

2011

Del Llano coached Enrique Happ and qualified for Copa Simón Bolívar Championship.

References

External links

 NASL stats

1949 births
Living people
Sportspeople from Cochabamba
Association football midfielders
Bolivian footballers
Bolivia international footballers
Bolivian football managers
American soccer players
United States men's international soccer players
Bolivian emigrants to the United States
American people of Bolivian descent
Dual internationalists (football)
C.D. Jorge Wilstermann players
Philadelphia Spartans players
Baltimore Bays (1972–73) players
Washington Diplomats (NASL) players
Club Bolívar players
Tacoma Tides players
The Strongest players
Botafogo de Futebol e Regatas players
Club Blooming players
Miami Freedom players
North American Soccer League (1968–1984) players
American Soccer League (1933–1983) players
American Soccer League (1988–89) players
Bolivian expatriate footballers
Expatriate footballers in Brazil
C.D. Jorge Wilstermann managers
Club San José managers
Club Aurora managers
Bolivian expatriate sportspeople in the United States
Expatriate soccer players in the United States
Expatriate soccer managers in the United States
American Soccer League (1988–89) coaches
La Paz F.C. managers